Peter Kurzweg (born 10 February 1994) is a German professional footballer who plays as a left-back for Würzburger Kickers.

Career
Peter Kurzweg started his career with TSV 1860 Munich and played for the second team in more than 40 league games.

He joined Würzburger Kickers in 2015 and on 30 May 2016, Kurzweg extended his contract with Würzburger Kickers until 2018.

In 2017, he joined 1. FC Union Berlin on a two-year contract. He scored a goal on his debut for them against Greuther Furth.

In 2018, he returned to Würzburger Kickers on loan until the end of 2018–19 season.

On 17 January 2022, Kurzweg returned to Würzburger Kickers once more.

References

External links
 
 

1994 births
Living people
Association football defenders
German footballers
Würzburger Kickers players
1. FC Union Berlin players
FC Ingolstadt 04 players
2. Bundesliga players
3. Liga players
Regionalliga players